Monday Kiz (Korean: 먼데이 키즈) was a South Korean boy band formed in 2005. The group originally consisted of two members: Lee Jin-sung and Kim Min-soo, but after the death of Min-soo in 2008 the group reformed with two new members: Han Seung-hee and Im Han-byeol, accompanied by original member Jin-sung. Monday Kiz released their first album, Bye Bye Bye on October 6, 2005.

Lee Jin-sung currently promotes as a soloist using the Monday Kiz name.

Members
Lee Jin-sung (2005–2015)
Kim Min-soo (2005–2008)
Han Seung-hee (2010–2014)
Im Han-byeol (2010–2014)

Discography

Studio albums

Extended plays

Singles

References

External links
Can Entertainment

K-pop music groups
South Korean boy bands
South Korean contemporary R&B musical groups